= Full keyboard =

The term full keyboard may refer to:

- a modern full-size computer keyboard, generally complete with arrow and number and function keys in a standard layout
  - in a more limited sense, a full-size laptop keyboard, generally just to accentuate the fact that individual keys are not size-reduced, which is not uncommon on laptops and similar – these keyboards may however lack some keys, though many use an fn key to compensate
- a historical full-featured typewriter keyboard without shift keys, which in the absence of that innovation featured whole additional rows of keys for upper- and lower-case characters
